Al-Sultan Abdullah Ri'ayatuddin Al-Mustafa Billah Shah ibni Almarhum Sultan Haji Ahmad Shah Al-Musta'in Billah (born 30 July 1959) has reigned as the 16th Yang di-Pertuan Agong (King) of Malaysia and the 6th Sultan of Pahang since January 2019.  He was proclaimed as sultan on 15 January 2019, succeeding his father, Sultan Ahmad Shah, whose abdication was decided at a Royal Council meeting on 11 January 2019.

On 24 January 2019, days after his accession to the throne of Pahang, he was elected as the 16th Yang di-Pertuan Agong, the head of state, of Malaysia, and was sworn in on 31 January 2019. He was also a member of the FIFA Council from 2015 to 2019. Abdullah had considerable involvement in the 2020–22 Malaysian political crisis.

Early life 
Tengku Abdullah was born on 30 July 1959 at Istana Mangga Tunggal, Pekan, Pahang. He is the first son of Sultan Ahmad Shah of Pahang and Tengku Ampuan Afzan. He is the fourth child among eight siblings. His eldest sibling is Tengku Meriam.

Tengku Abdullah received his early education in Clifford School, Kuala Lipis in 1965. He continued his primary education in Sekolah Kebangsaan Ahmad, Pekan from 1966 to 1969 and St. Thomas Primary School and his secondary education in St. Thomas Secondary School from 1970 to 1974, both located in Kuantan. He went to Aldenham School, Elstree, Hertfordshire, UK – Advance School from 1975 to 1977. He also attended The Royal Military Academy Sandhurst, United Kingdom from 1978 to 1979 as well as Worcester College Oxford and Queen Elizabeth College, United Kingdom from 1980 to 1981 graduating with a Diploma in International Relations and Diplomacy.

Tengku Mahkota and Regent of Pahang 
Abdullah was appointed as the Tengku Mahkota, the crown prince of Pahang on 1 July 1975. He was formally installed on 23 October 1977 at Istana Abu Bakar, Pekan.

He was also appointed as the Regent of Pahang twice. The first time was when his father was elected as the seventh Yang di-Pertuan Agong, where he became Regent for five years, starting from 28 April 1979 until 25 April 1984. When his father's health deteriorated in 2016, Abdullah served again as the Regent from 28 December 2016 until he ascended the throne and became the Sultan of Pahang in 2019.

Sultan of Pahang 
On 15 January 2019, at the age of 59, Abdullah was proclaimed as the sixth Sultan of modern Pahang upon the abdication of his father due to ill health. The ceremony took place at Istana Abu Bakar, the official residence of the Sultan of Pahang. His reign was declared retroactively began on 11 January 2019, the day the Regency Council decided his succession.

Upon his accession to throne of Pahang, Abdullah took the regnal title "Al-Sultan Abdullah Ri'ayatuddin Al-Mustafa Billah Shah". His royal consort, Tunku Azizah Aminah Maimunah Iskandariah Binti Almarhum Sultan Iskandar, the Tengku Puan (Crown Princess) of Pahang was proclaimed as the Tengku Ampuan (Queen consort) of Pahang on 29 January 2019.

Yang di-Pertuan Agong

On 24 January 2019 Thursday, the Conference of Rulers elected Sultan Abdullah as the 16th Yang di-Pertuan Agong of Malaysia to replace Sultan Muhammad V of Kelantan who abdicated weeks earlier. Sultan Abdullah was sworn in as the 16th King of Malaysia on 31 January 2019 in a public ceremony as he officially took up the residency of the Istana Negara, Jalan Tuanku Abdul Halim. The Conference of Rulers also elected Sultan Nazrin Muizzuddin Shah of Perak as the Deputy Yang di-Pertuan Agong.

Regarding the regency of Pahang throughout Sultan Abdullah's tenure as the Yang di-Pertuan Agong, the duty of ruling the state was handed to Sultan Abdullah's son, Tengku Hassanal Ibrahim Alam Shah, who was proclaimed as the Tengku Mahkota and Regent of Pahang on 29 January 2019.

On the date of appointment, Tengku Hassanal was still pursuing his studies at the Royal Military Academy Sandhurst, United Kingdom. He was assisted in carrying out his duties by the Majlis Jumaah Pangkuan Diraja Negeri Pahang ('Pahang Council of Regency') led by Sultan Abdullah's eldest younger brother who is also Tengku Hassanal's uncle, Tengku Abdul Rahman Ibni Sultan Haji Ahmad Shah, from 15 February 2019 until his graduation on 15 December 2019.

Sultan Abdullah ceremonial installation as King took place at the Throne Hall of the Istana Negara on 30 July 2019, seven months after his assumption of the throne on his 60th birthday.

The installation on 30 July 2019 has yet another historical significance because Sultan Abdullah and the Raja Permaisuri Agong, Tunku Azizah Aminah Maimunah Iskandariah, are the children of sultans who had been previously elected as the Yang di-Pertuan Agong.

He holds the rank of Marshal of the Royal Malaysian Air Force in his full constitutional duties as Commander-in-Chief of the Malaysian Armed Forces as well as the ranks of Field Marshal of the Malaysian Army and Admiral of the Fleet of the Royal Malaysian Navy, in addition, he is the current Colonel-in-chief of the Royal Malaysian Air Force, having taken over the duties since his assumption to the throne, previously he acted as his father's representative to RMAF events and ceremonies twice in his capacity as Regent.

He is the chancellor of MARA University of Technology (UiTM), National Defence University of Malaysia (UPNM) and University of Kuala Lumpur (UniKL).

Events during Kingship

As Yang di-Pertuan Agong, Sultan Abdullah reigned during a politically unstable period of Malaysian history. His reign witnessed the fall of the Pakatan Harapan administration of Prime Minister Mahathir Mohamad after the Sheraton Move incident on 21 February 2020, which eventually led to Mahathir's resignation on 24 February 2020. To maintain political stability until the decision to appoint a new Prime Minister had been made, Sultan Abdullah asked Tun Dr. Mahathir Mohamad to serve as Interim Prime Minister until 1 March 2020 when Muhyiddin Yassin was chosen as the new Prime Minister to succeed Tun Mahathir.

On 25 October 2020, Sultan Abdullah rejected Prime Minister Muhyiddin Yassin's request for him to declare a state of emergency in response to a spike in COVID-19 cases throughout Malaysia. On 12 January 2021, Sultan Abdullah issued a nationwide Proclamation of Emergency until 1 August to address the ongoing spread of COVID-19 and a political crisis involving Muhyiddin Yassin's Perikatan Nasional government. Under this Proclamation of Emergency, parliament and elections will be suspended while the Malaysian Government will be empowered to introduce laws without Parliamentary scrutiny and oversight. The decision on the new administrative policies changes and the government's mismanagement in handling the COVID-19 growing cases in Malaysia provoked widespread anger among Malaysians. On July 31, 2021, hundreds of protesters gathered in Kuala Lumpur calling for Muhyiddin's resignation over his government's response to the pandemic.

On 8 July 2021, UMNO withdrew support for Muhyiddin and called for his resignation in July 2021. As a response to the call for him to resign, Muhyiddin Yassin submitted a motion of confidence to Sultan Abdullah on 4 August 2021 stating that he still had the majority support within the lower house of parliament Dewan Rakyat.

On 15 August 2021, Muhyiddin and his cabinet submitted their resignation to Sultan Abdullah on Monday, 16 August 2021. Sultan Abdullah then decided to appoint the Deputy Prime Minister, Ismail Sabri as the 9th Prime Minister of Malaysia after he had commanded the confidence of the majority in Parliament, with a total of 114 from 220 members of the Dewan Rakyat nominating him in accordance with Article 40(2)(a) and Article 43(2)(a) of the Federal Constitution. He was formally sworn in as Prime Minister at the Istana Negara on 21 August 2021.

On 10 October 2022, following days of speculation over the potential dissolution of the Malaysian parliament, it was announced that Sultan Abdullah, as per the Federal Constitution, had approved Ismail Sabri's request to dissolve parliament, thereby paving the way for Malaysia's 15th general election. The election produced Malaysia's first ever hung parliament. With neither the opposition leader Anwar Ibrahim nor the former Prime Minister Muhyiddin Yassin winning the simple majority needed to form a government, the decision on who would be the next Prime Minister fell to the King. Abdullah would eventually name Anwar Ibrahim as Malaysia's 10th Prime Minister, and the 4th Prime Minister of his reign, making Abdullah the Yang di-Pertuan Agong who had presided over the most number of tenures of Malaysian Prime Ministers since independence. Sultan Abdullah is also the King who has appointed the most prime ministers since Malaysia's independence, with incumbent, Anwar, being the third consecutive prime minister appointed by Abdullah.

Military career 
Tengku Abdullah began his military career at the Royal Military Academy Sandhurst, the United Kingdom in 1978 as Officer Cadet. There, he became good friend with Sheikh Mohamed bin Zayed Al Nahyan, who would later become the President of the United Arab Emirates and Ruler of Abu Dhabi and Zulkiple Kassim, his senior and later became the Chief of Army. He was commissioned as Second lieutenant by Queen Elizabeth II in 1979. In 1980, he was promoted to captain and served as cavalry officer in the Royal Armoured Corps. In 1987, he was promoted to Major, the Royal Armoured Corps.

In 1999, he was assigned to the Territorial Army Regiment (Malay: Rejimen Askar Wataniah) and in the same time was promoted to Lieutenant Colonel and one year later, in 2000, he was promoted again to Colonel.

Tengku Abdullah was then promoted to Brigadier general in 2004.

Sport career 
Tengku Abdullah is also active in sports. Amongst his favourite sports are polo, football and hockey. He participates in local as well as international tournaments. He led the Pahang Royal Polo team in an international tournament at the Windsor Polo Club, England. He has also participated in tournaments in Singapore, the Philippines, Brunei, Argentina, the United States, Spain, Belgium and Thalland. His prowess in polo gave him a gold medal at the 12th SEA Games Singapore in 1983.

He is a vice-president of the Asian Football Confederation (AFC) executive committee and president of the Asian Hockey Federation. He is also the Honorary Member of International Hockey Federation (FIH).

Family 

His first marriage was to Tunku Azizah Aminah Maimunah Iskandariah binti Almarhum Al-Mutawakkil Alallah Sultan Iskandar Al-Haj, at the Sultan Abu Bakar State Mosque, Johor Bahru, on 6 March 1986. She is the third daughter of Sultan Iskandar of Johor by his first wife, Enche' Besar Kalsom binti Abdullah (née Josephine Ruby Trevorrow). Azizah has now thus been titled Tengku Ampuan Pahang (Queen Consort of Pahang) in addition to her Johor title of Paduka Puteri in 1986. She is the younger sister of the current Sultan of Johor, Sultan Ibrahim ibni Almarhum Sultan Iskandar. They have four sons and two daughters together.

His second marriage was in 1991 to Julia Rais (born at Kota Bharu, Kelantan, a former actress and daughter of Abdul Rais, in a private ceremony at Fraser's Hill in 1991. They have three daughters together.

Sons 
He is a son of Tunku Azizah

Daughters 
On 24 August 2018, she married Tengku Abu Bakar Ahmad Bin Almarhum Tengku Arif Bendahara Tengku Abdullah. The couple's first child, a son named Tengku Zayn Edin Shah, was born on 23 July 2019. The couple's second child, a daughter named Tengku Aleya Norlini, was born on 2 February 2022
 Tengku Puteri Ilisha Ameera, daughter of Julia Abdul Rais (born on  Pantai Hospital Kuala Lumpur

Adoptive son 
Abdullah also adopted a son before the birth of his own:

Tengku Amir Nasser Ibrahim ibni Almarhum Tengku Arif Bendahara Ibrahim, the Tengku Panglima Raja (shortly Tengku Amir), adopted in 1987.

Tengku Amir Nasser Ibrahim and Puteri Suraiya Afzan Binti Mohamed Moiz, the Cik Puan Panglima married on 19 December 2013. The couple's first child, a son named Tengku Adam Ibrahim Shah, was born on 27 December 2015. Their second child, a son named Tengku Sulaiman Abdullah Shah, was born 25 June 2018. Their third child, a son named Tengku Nuh Muhammad Shah was born on 31 January 2022.

Styles, titles and honours

Styles and titles
 30 July 1959 – 8 May 1974: His Highness Tengku Abdullah Ibni Tengku Ahmad Shah
 8 May 1974 – 1 July 1975: His Highness Tengku Abdullah Al-Haj Ibni Sultan Haji Ahmad Shah Al-Musta’in Billah
 1 July 1975 – 28 April 1979: His Royal Highness Tengku Abdullah Al-Haj Ibni Sultan Haji Ahmad Shah Al-Musta’in Billah, Crown Prince of Pahang
 28 April 1979 – 25 April 1984: His Royal Highness Tengku Abdullah Al-Haj Ibni Sultan Haji Ahmad Shah Al-Musta’in Billah, Crown Prince and Regent of Pahang
 25 April 1984 – 28 December 2016: His Royal Highness Tengku Abdullah Al-Haj Ibni Sultan Haji Ahmad Shah Al-Musta’in Billah, Crown Prince of Pahang
 28 December 2016 – 11 January 2019: His Royal Highness Tengku Abdullah Al-Haj Ibni Sultan Haji Ahmad Shah Al-Musta’in Billah, Crown Prince and Regent of Pahang
 11 January 2019 – 15 January 2019: His Royal Highness Sultan Abdullah Al-Haj Ibni Sultan Haji Ahmad Shah Al-Musta’in Billah, Sultan of Pahang 
15 January 2019 – 31 January 2019: His Royal Highness Al-Sultan Abdullah Ri’ayatuddin Al-Mustafa Billah Shah Al-Haj Ibni Sultan Haji Ahmad Shah Al-Musta’in Billah, Sultan of Pahang
31 January 2019 - 22 May 2019: His Majesty Al-Sultan Abdullah Ri’ayatuddin Al Mustafa Billah Shah Ibni Sultan Haji Ahmad Shah Al-Musta’in Billah, The 16th Yang Di-Pertuan Agong 
22 May 2019 – present: His Majesty Al-Sultan Abdullah Ri’ayatuddin Al Mustafa Billah Shah Ibni Almarhum Sultan Haji Ahmad Shah Al-Musta’in Billah, The 16th Yang Di-Pertuan Agong

Military ranks 
 Malaysia

 
 1978: Officer cadet
 1979: Leftenan Muda ('Second lieutenant') (short service commission)
 1979: Leftenan ('Lieutenant')
 1980: Kapten ('Captain'), The Royal Armoured Corps
 1987: Mejar ('Major'), The Royal Armoured Corps
 1999: Leftenan Kolonel ('Lieutenant colonel'), The 505th Territorial Army Regiment
 2000: Kolonel ('Colonel'), The 505th Territorial Army Regiment
 2004: Brigedier Jeneral ('Brigadier general'), The 505th Territorial Army Regiment
 
 2019: Kolonel Yang Di-Pertua ('Colonel-in-chief'), Royal Malaysian Air Force
  Malaysian Armed Forces
 2019: Pemerintah Tertinggi ('Commander-in-Chief'), Malaysian Armed Forces

Awards and recognitions 

He has been awarded :

Honours of Pahang 

  : 
  Grand Master and Member of the Royal Family Order of Pahang (DKP)
  Grand Master and Member 1st class of the Family Order of the Crown of Indra of Pahang (DK I) 
  Grand Master and Grand Knight of the Order of Sultan Ahmad Shah of Pahang (SSAP, 24 October 1980) 
  Grand Master and Grand Knight of the Order of the Crown of Pahang (SIMP)

Malaysia and its other states 

 :
  Recipient (DKM, 11 July 2019) and Grand Master of the Order of the Royal Family of Malaysia (31 January 2019)
 Recipient (DMN, 14 February 2019) and Grand Master of the Order of the Crown of the Realm (31 January 2019)
  Grand Master of the Order of the Defender of the Realm (31 January 2019) 
  Grand Master of the Order of Loyalty to the Crown of Malaysia (31 January 2019) 
  Grand Master of the Order of Merit of Malaysia (31 January 2019) 
  Grand Master of the Order of Meritorious Service (31 January 2019) 
  Grand Master of the Order of Loyalty to the Royal Family of Malaysia (31 January 2019)
 Warrior of the Order of Military Service of Malaysia (PAT)
  : 
  Member first class of the Family Order of Terengganu (DK I)
  : 
  First Class of the Royal Family Order of Johor (DK I)
  Knight Grand Commander of the Order of the Crown of Johor (SPMJ)
  : 
  Member of the Royal Family Order of Kedah (DK, 5 September 2019)
  : 
  Member of the Perlis Family Order of the Gallant Prince Syed Putra Jamalullail (DK, 28 October 2019)
  : 
  Recipient of the Royal Family Order of Perak (DK, 28 November 2019)
  : 
  First Class of the Royal Family Order of Selangor (DK I, 11 December 2020)

Foreign honours

  : 
  Recipient of Royal Family Order of the Crown of Brunei (DKMB, 19 August 2019)
  Sultan of Brunei Golden Jubilee Medal (5 October 2017)
  : 
 Collar of the Order of the State of Republic of Turkey (16 August 2022)

Honorary degrees

  :
 Honorary Ph.D. degree in Political Science and International Relations from Marmara University (2022)

Places named after him

Several places were named after him, including:

 Al-Sultan Abdullah Ri'ayatuddin Al-Mustafa Billah Shah Mosque in Jengka, Pahang 
 Hospital Al-Sultan Abdullah Universiti Teknologi MARA (UiTM) in Puncak Alam, Selangor
 Al-Sultan Abdullah Camp of the Joint Forces Headquarters in Kuantan, Pahang
 Al-Sultan Abdullah Foundation Hemodialysis Cantres in Cheras, Kuala Lumpur; Setiawangsa, Kuala Lumpur; Taman Melati, Kuala Lumpur and Pekan, Pahang
 Al-Sultan Abdullah Mosque in Masjid Tanah, Malacca
 Tengku Mahkota Abdullah Mosque in Kuantan, Pahang
 Tengku Mahkota Abdullah Mosque in Jerantut, Pahang
 Tengku Mahkota Abdullah Mosque in Rompin, Pahang
 Tengku Abdullah Al-Haj Mosque in Balok, Pahang
 Tengku Abdullah Science School (SEMESTA Raub), a secondary school in Raub, Pahang

Ancestry

Notes

References

|-

1959 births
Living people
Abdullah
Monarchs of Malaysia
Abdullah
Abdullah
Field marshals of Malaysia
Malaysian people of Malay descent
Malaysian Muslims
People educated at Aldenham School
First Classes of the Royal Family Order of Johor
Knights Grand Commander of the Order of the Crown of Johor
First Classes of the Family Order of Terengganu
First Classes of Royal Family Order of Selangor
Recipients of the Order of the Crown of the Realm
Recipients of the Darjah Kerabat Diraja Malaysia
Abdullah
Recipients of the Order of Merit of Malaysia